Alvaredo is a Portuguese freguesia ("civil parish"), located in the municipality of Melgaço. The population in 2011 was 528, in an area of 4.36 km2.

Architecture
 Chapel of São Brás
 Chapel of São João
 Church of São Martinho

References

Freguesias of Melgaço, Portugal